Millennium Mambo is a 2001 Taiwanese romantic drama film directed by Hou Hsiao-hsien.

Plot
The main character, Vicky, portrayed by actress Shu Qi, narrates from 2011 about her life 10 years earlier. She describes her youth and story of her changing life at the beginning of the new millennium. She works as a hostess in a trendy bar.  Vicky is torn between two men, Hao-Hao and Jack, and her journeys display the parallel journey of the psyche and how one girl deals with her fleeting youth.

Cast

According to Maggie Cheung from a press conference for In the Mood for Love, she and Tony Leung Chiu-wai were initially tapped to play the main roles for the film.

Awards and nominations
2001 Cannes Film Festival
Won: Technical Grand Prize (Tu Duu-Chih for sound design)
Nominated: Palme d'Or
Chicago International Film Festival
Won: Silver Hugo (Hou Hsiao-hsien)
Ghent International Film Festival
Won: Best Director (Hou Hsiao-hsien)
Nominated: Grand Prix
Golden Horse Film Festival
Won: Best Cinematography (Pin Bing Lee)
Won: Best Original Score (Lim Giong)
Won: Best Sound Effects (Tu Duu-Chih)

References

External links

 
 HK cinemagic entry

2001 films
2001 romantic drama films
Films directed by Hou Hsiao-hsien
Films set in 2010
2000s Mandarin-language films
Films with screenplays by Chu T’ien-wen
Taiwanese romantic drama films